Chamaeleontiformes is a hypothesized clade (evolutionary grouping) of iguanian lizards defined as all taxa sharing a more recent common ancestor with Chamaeleo chamaeleon (the common chamaeleon) than with Hoplocercus spinosus (the Brazilian spiny-tailed lizard), Polychrus marmoratus (bush lizard), or Iguana iguana (green iguana). It was named by paleontologist Jack Conrad in 2008 to describe a clade recovered in his phylogenetic analysis that included the extinct genus Isodontosaurus, the extinct family Priscagamidae, and the living clade Acrodonta, which includes agamids and chameleons. It is a stem-based taxon and one of two major clades within Iguania, the other being Pleurodonta. Below is a cladogram from Daza et al. (2012) showing this phylogeny:

Other analyses place Priscagamidae outside Iguania altogether, resulting in a Chamaeleontiformes that only includes Isodontosaurus and Acrodonta. Below is a cladogram from Conrad (2015) with this phylogeny:

References 

Iguanomorpha